Lily Bay, Maine may refer to one of two places in the U.S. state of Maine:

Lily Bay, a bay of Moosehead Lake in Piscataquis County
Lily Bay State Park, a  public recreation area in Greenville